Conquest is an independent  investment banking and asset management services firm founded in 2010 and owned by its directors. The head-office of its advisory services is registered in London, United Kingdom, and it has primary operations in Asia-Pacific, Continental Europe and Latin America. The head-office of its asset management business is registered in Luxembourg.

The company is mainly a generalist advisory firm which advises its clients - mainly corporations, partnerships,  private equity firms and institutional investors - on mergers & acquisitions, build-up, divestitures, financings, capital raising, private placement and joint-ventures. It does not seem to focus specifically on a sector but rather on specific investment situations. Since 2014 it has been more active in industrials, infrastructure, energy - including renewables,

, energy efficiency  - and transportation. It appears to have also launched its fund management activity in relation to infrastructure investments.

References

External links
Conquest Group Website

Financial services companies established in 2010
Banks established in 2010
Investment banks
Investment banking private equity groups